Joseph Lambert may refer to:

Joseph Hamilton Lambert (1825–1909), American pioneer of Oregon
Malet Lambert (priest) (Joseph Malet Lambert), British clergyman, historian and educator
Joseph Lambert (judge) (born 1948), former Chief Justice of the Kentucky Supreme Court
Joseph B. Lambert (born 1940), American educator and chemist
Adrien Lambert (Joseph Adrien Henri Lambert, 1913–2003), member of the Canadian House of Commons
Jerome Lambert (Joseph Jerome Lambert, 1971–2007), American basketball player
Joseph Lambert (Haitian politician) (born 1961), Haitian politician, disputed acting president of Haiti